Hot Fuzz: Music from the Motion Picture is the soundtrack album to the 2007 British crime-comedy film, Hot Fuzz. The album was released on 19 February 2007 in the United Kingdom, and on 17 April 2007 in the United States and Canada. The UK release contains 22 tracks, and the US/Canada release has 14.

Composition
The film's score is by British film composer David Arnold, who has scored the James Bond film series since 1997. Among Arnold's works featured on the soundtrack album is the "Hot Fuzz Suite", which is a compilation of excerpts from the score.

Other music from the film is a mix of 1960s and 1970s British rock (The Kinks, T.Rex, The Move, Sweet, The Troggs, Arthur Brown, Cozy Powell), new wave (Adam Ant, XTC) and indie UK and American rock (The Fratellis, Eels, Jon Spencer).

Dialogue by Simon Pegg, Nick Frost and various other cast members is interwoven into the music itself, rather than being on separate tracks.

Themes 

The song selection also includes some police-themed titles, including Supergrass' "Caught by the Fuzz" as well as "Here Come the Fuzz", which was specially composed for the film by The Jon Spencer Blues Explosion. The film score also references and parodies the scores from action films, with the song "Lethal Fuzz", containing samples of the music used in promotional trailers from the first four films of the Lethal Weapon series.

Credits 
American film director Robert Rodriguez contributed to the film's score, and is acknowledged in the UK album's liner notes. 
The liner notes also credit music supervisor Nick Angel (the person who Simon Pegg's character is named after) and film director Edgar Wright as executive producers, while British mashup and breakbeat DJ Osymyso (Mark Nicholson) is credited as producer. Kathy Nelson is listed as Executive producer in charge of music at Universal Pictures: Osymyso had previously worked with Pegg and Wright on their previous film, Shaun of the Dead.

Track listings

Other songs in the film
Songs featured in the film but not included on either soundtrack release include:
 "Down On Bond Street" – Tommy McCook & the Super Sonics
 "Foot Chase" – Mark Isham (from Point Break)
 "Happy Birthday" – Jim Broadbent, Olivia Colman, Kevin Eldon, Karl Johnson, Simon Pegg & Edgar Wright
 "Heston Services" – Robert Rodriguez and Carl Thiel
 "Hostage Situation" – Trevor Rabin  (from Bad Boys II)
 "Lethal Weapon 3 Trailer Score" – John Eric Alexander
 "Lovefool" – Dick Breeze, Emma Dance, David Goodall, Diane Leach, Tim Lee, George Marsh, Lucy Punch, David Threlfall, Bernard Usher, Clive Weatherley & Jonathan Whitehead
 "Nostalgia" – Frank Comstock
 "Romeo and Juliet" by Dire Straits. In his DVD commentary, director Edgar Wright notes the irony of having to pay Dire Straits to use the song after he had poked fun at the band in his previous film, Shaun of the Dead.
 "Village Green" by The Kinks.

References

External links

2000s film soundtrack albums
2007 soundtrack albums
Comedy film soundtracks